Alvorada - Brazil's Changing Face (often referred to as only "Alvorada") is a 1962 West German documentary film directed by Hugo Niebeling. It was nominated for an Academy Award for Best Documentary Feature and was entered into the 1963 Cannes Film Festival.

Overview
The film offers an overview of Brazil, from the history of the country to the most recent developments at the time of its making - including developments of the industry and the new capital Brasília. It starts with an overview of the country itself and its history, and then proceeds to the social structure and social changes brought by industrialization and other development in recent years.

Style
The film does neither follow the camera- and editing-conventions of documentary films in the early 1960s, nor their narrative style. Instead, it uses experimental camera and editing techniques, often set to different kinds of music and electronic sounds by Oskar Sala. The voice-over-narration of the film (provided by Hugo Niebeling himself) only occasionally tells the viewer details about what they are seeing, often letting impressions speak for themselves. According to Hugo Niebeling, due to its tight connection of music and visual style, Alvorada is also his first "music film".

Reception
 Melbourne International Film Festival: "A film that does not attempt to give a reasoned, historical or geographical account, but reproduces the visual and emotional impact on a sensitive mind. No technique, no angle, no method of camera transport has been left unexplored, (...) an exciting and beautiful kaleidoscope of images."

Awards
1962: Oscar Nomination in the Category: "Documentary Feature". (Feature)
1963: Bundesfilmpreis - Filmband in Gold: Best Director (Hugo Niebeling)
1963: Bundesfilmpreis - Filmband in Gold: Best feature-length cultural- and documentary-film (Mannesmann AG)
1963: Cannes Film Festival - Official Selection
1964: Melbourne International Film Festival - Official Selection

References

External links

1962 films
1962 documentary films
1960s German-language films
West German films
German documentary films
Films shot in Brazil
1960s German films